Felipe Miñambres Fernández (born 29 April 1965) is a Spanish retired footballer who played as an attacking midfielder, currently director of football of Levante UD.

He spent 12 seasons in La Liga, with Sporting de Gijón (two years) and Tenerife (ten), amassing totals of 348 games and 42 goals. He represented Spain at the 1994 World Cup.

Miñambres worked with several clubs as a manager since 1999, being in charge of Tenerife, Salamanca, Rayo Vallecano and Levante in the Segunda División.

Club career
A product of Sporting de Gijón's famed youth system, Mareo, Miñambres was born in Astorga, Province of León, and made his debut with the first team during 1987–88, being an undisputed starter the following season when he scored a career-best nine goals in La Liga.

For the 1989–90 campaign, Miñambres signed with CD Tenerife, going on to be active part of the club's top-flight consolidation and subsequent UEFA Cup participations. As the Canary Islands side were relegated in 1999, he retired from football at the age of 34 and went into management.

Miñambres started coaching former team Tenerife (being one of four managers during 1999–2000 in the Segunda División), then continued with Hércules CF, UD Salamanca, Alicante CF and UE Lleida. In the 2007–08 season, he became Rayo Vallecano's director of football.

On 15 February 2010, with the Madrid club now in the second tier but immerse in a sporting crisis, Miñambres replaced the dismissed Pepe Mel as coach. In June, after helping them to retain their league status, he returned to the office.

After leaving the Campo de Fútbol de Vallecas in 2016, Miñambres was employed in the same capacity at RC Celta de Vigo. On 11 February 2022, he moved to Levante UD also as a director of football, but was also in charge of the team for two matches in October after relieving Mehdi Nafti of his duties.

International career
Over four and a half years, Miñambres won six caps for Spain and scored two goals. His debut came on 13 December 1989 in a 2–1 friendly victory over Switzerland, and he netted the last in the 59th minute of a match played in Santa Cruz de Tenerife.

Miñambres was subsequently part of Spain's squad at the 1994 FIFA World Cup, appearing against South Korea and Bolivia.

Managerial statistics

References

External links

1965 births
Living people
People from Astorga, Spain
Spanish footballers
Footballers from Castile and León
Association football midfielders
La Liga players
Segunda División B players
Tercera División players
Atlético Astorga FC players
Zamora CF footballers
Sporting de Gijón B players
Sporting de Gijón players
CD Tenerife players
Spain international footballers
1994 FIFA World Cup players
Spanish football managers
Segunda División managers
Segunda División B managers
CD Tenerife managers
Hércules CF managers
UD Salamanca managers
Alicante CF managers
UE Lleida managers
Rayo Vallecano managers
Levante UD managers
RC Celta de Vigo non-playing staff